Microtel may refer to:

 Microtel Inn and Suites, a franchise brand of hotels owned by Wyndham Hotels and Resorts
 Microtel Communications, the former name of Orange Personal Communications Services Ltd in the UK before its acquisition and merging by France Telecom S.A., now Orange S.A.
 Microtel Pacific Research, formerly AEL Microtel then just Microtel, a former research arm of BC Tel in Canada